Richard Egielski (born July 16, 1952) is an American illustrator and writer, best known for illustrating children's picture books.

Career
Richard Egielski was born in New York City. He won the 1987 Caldecott Medal for the year's best-illustrated U.S. picture book, recognizing Hey, Al, by Arthur Yorinks. Egielski is married to Denise Saldutti, who is also an artist/illustrator. Egielski lives in Milford, New Jersey. He was featured in the October 2011 issue of BookPage. Egielski has altogether illustrated over fifty books that are directed towards children. Eight of those fifty books that he has illustrated, he has also written. He studied at the Parson's School of Design. He also studied the art of picture books with Maurice Sendak. In the year of 1976, Egielski had joined together with the author Arthur Yorinks. Together they were able to create nine various picture books. Those books included the award-winning book, Hey, Al. Hey, Al was awarded the 1987 Caldecott Medal by the American Library Association. Egielski also is known for his illustrations in the popular books known as the Tub People series that was written by Pam Conrad. In the year of 1995, Egielski wrote and illustrated Buz that was chosen by the New York Times to be one of the top ten best children's books that year for its illustrations. He then illustrated the book Jazper that was also chosen to be a New York Times Best Illustrated Book in 1998. His artwork is gathered, collected, and exhibited in galleries that range from colleges, universities, private collections, public collections, and corporate collections. The places that hold his artwork expand from Los Angeles to New York City. Egielski's most recent title is called The End, which is written by David LaRochelle. Richard Egielski currently resides in Milford, New Jersey with his wife and son. He is Polish American.

Selected works

 The Letter, the Witch, and the Ring (1976), by John Bellairs, a novel
 Louis the Fish (1980), by Arthur Yorinks 
 Amy's Eyes (1985), by Richard Kennedy, a novel
 Hey, Al (1986), by Arthur Yorinks
 The Tub people (1989), by Pam Conrad 
 Buz (1995) by Egielski 
 The Gingerbread Boy (1997), by Egielski
 The Web Files (2001), by Margie Palatini
 Slim and Jim (2002), by Egielski
 The Fierce Yellow Pumpkin (2003), by Margaret Wise Brown
 The End (2007), by David LaRochelle

References

External links

 "Egielski, Richard", Encyclopædia Britannica Academic Edition

 

1952 births
Caldecott Medal winners
American children's book illustrators
People from Milford, New Jersey
Writers from New York City
Living people
American people of Polish descent
Artists from New York City